Matt Henningsen (born July 9, 1999) is an American football defensive end for the Denver Broncos of the National Football League (NFL). He played college football at Wisconsin.

Professional career

Henningsen was drafted by the Denver Broncos in the sixth round, 206th overall, of the 2022 NFL Draft.

References

External links
Denver Broncos bio
 Wisconsin Badgers bio

1999 births
Living people
American football defensive tackles
American football defensive ends
Wisconsin Badgers football players
Denver Broncos players